Bréhat may refer to:

 Île-de-Bréhat, an island located off the northern coast of Brittany.
 BRÉHAT, a real-time localization system employed by SNCF.
 Great Brehat, a settlement in Newfoundland and Labrador, Canada

See also
 Paimpol–Bréhat tidal farm, tidal turbine demonstration farm off Île-de-Bréhat near Paimpol, France